The Journal of Clinical Neuroscience is a bimonthly peer-reviewed medical journal covering the discipline of neurosurgery and neurology. It was established in 1994 and is published by the Elsevier imprint Churchill Livingstone. It is the official journal of the Asian Australasian Society of Neurological Surgeons. The editor-in-chief is Andrew H. Kaye.

The Journal of Clinical Neuroscience publishes articles on clinical neurosurgery and neurology and related neurosciences such as neuro-pathology, neuro-radiology, neuro-ophthalmology and neuro-physiology.

References

External links 
 Neurosurgical Society of Australasia
 Neurosurgical Society of Australasia
 Australian and New Zealand Society for Neuropathology
 Taiwan Neurosurgical Society
 Asian/Australian Society of Neurological Surgeons

Publications established in 1994
Neurology journals
Elsevier academic journals
English-language journals
Bimonthly journals